Fort Garland (1858–1883), Colorado, United States, was designed to house two companies of soldiers to protect settlers in the San Luis Valley, then in the Territory of New Mexico. It was named for General John Garland, commander of the Military District of New Mexico.

History
Colonel Kit Carson and New Mexico Volunteers were stationed here in 1866 and he successfully negotiated a treaty with the Utes in 1867.

The Ninth Cavalry (Buffalo Soldiers) was stationed here between 1876 and 1879. In 1876, these troops were called to the La Plata region to prevent conflict between the Utes and white prospectors.  The following year, they helped remove white settlers from Ute reservation lands.

In 1879, United States military units from Fort Garland were called upon by Nathan Meeker, the Indian Agent at the White River Agency. Meeker and others were killed, and family members taken captive by unhappy Utes. The captives were released and the Utes were moved once again, which reduced the need for a fort.

Fort Garland Museum
The Colorado Historical Society restored the fort and opened the Fort Garland Museum in 1950. Restored and reconstructed buildings include the adobe Commandant's Quarters, where Kit Carson and his wife once lived, the cavalry barracks with exhibits of Hispanic traditional arts and 19th century transportation artifacts, and officer's quarters. Permanent exhibits focus on Kit Carson and Buffalo Soldiers. The museum is administered by History Colorado.

Pike's Stockade, the reconstructed stockade site where Zebulon Pike raised the American flag in 1807, is located about 45 miles southwest of the fort.

See also
National Register of Historic Places listings in Costilla County, Colorado

References

External links

Fort Garland Museum & Cultural Center History Colorado
Fort Garland Museum San Luis Valley Museum Association
Friends of Fort Garland Museum
Fort Garland, Colorado Sangres.com

1858 establishments in New Mexico Territory
1883 disestablishments in the United States
Garland
Closed installations of the United States Army
Military and war museums in Colorado
Museums established in 1950
Museums in Costilla County, Colorado
History Colorado
Garland
1950 establishments in Colorado
National Register of Historic Places in Costilla County, Colorado